Narayan Chandel (born 19 April 1965) is an Indian politician and Leader Of Opposition of Bharatiya Janata Party, Chhattisgarh State.
He is Member of Chhattisgarh Legislative Assembly representing Janjgir-Champa and also served as Deputy speaker of Chhattisgarh Legislative Assembly.

Political career 
Chandel was first elected to Madhya Pradesh Legislative Assembly in 1998. After creation of Chhattisgarh state from Madhya Pradesh, he contested 2003 Chhattisgarh Legislative Assembly election from same constituency but lost to Moti Lal Dewangan of Indian National Congress by margin of 7,710 votes.

Again, he won 2008 assembly election and became Deputy Speaker in Chhattisgarh Legislative Assembly. In 2018, Chandel was again elected to assembly by defeating Moti Lal Dewangan of Congress Party by margin of 4,188 votes.

References

1965 births
Living people
Madhya Pradesh MLAs 1998–2003
Chhattisgarh MLAs 2008–2013
Chhattisgarh MLAs 2018–2023
Bharatiya Janata Party politicians from Chhattisgarh
People from Janjgir-Champa district
Bharatiya Janata Party politicians from Madhya Pradesh